Theegalagutta Palle or Theegalaguttapally is a village in Karimnagar district of the Indian state of Telangana.

Villages in Karimnagar district